Minbya Township is a township of Mrauk-U District in the Rakhine State of Myanmar. The principal town is Minbya.

Townships of Rakhine State